Etienne de Mauléon also known as Stephanus, was an eleventh-century French Catholic Bishop of Oloron. Not much is known of his career or episcopal work but he was Bishop from 1060 A.D. until 1078 when he was succeeded by the reformer Amat d'Oloron.

References 

Bishops of Oloron
11th-century French Roman Catholic bishops